The 2015 Kazakhstan Cup is the 24th season of the Kazakhstan Cup, the annual nationwide football cup competition of Kazakhstan since the independence of the country. The competition began on 29 March 2015 and will end with the final in November 2015. Kairat are the defending champions, having won their first cup in the 2014 competition.

The winner of the competition will qualify for the first qualifying round of the 2016–17 UEFA Europa League.

Participating clubs 
The following 25 teams qualified for the competition:

Schedule
The rounds of the 2015 competition are scheduled as follows:
 Preliminary Round: 29 March 2015
 Round 1: 12 April 2015
 Round 2: 29 April 2015
 Quarterfinal: 20 May 2015
 Semifinal: 2 June–23 September 2015
 Final: 21 November 2015 at Astana Arena, Astana

Preliminary round
Matches of the preliminary round took place on March 29, 2015 and featured the 10 lowest placed clubs from the Kazakhstan First Division.

First round
Matches of the first round took place on 11/12 April 2015 and featured the 5 winners from the preliminary round and the three remaining Kazakhstan First Division teams.

Second round
Matches of the second round took place on 28/29 April 2015 and featured the 4 winners from the first round and the 12 Kazakhstan Premier League teams.

Quarter finals
On 30 April 2015, the eight winners from the Second Round were drawn in to four Quarter Final ties, to be played on 20 May 2015.

Semi-finals

|}

Final

Scorers
6 goals:

 Patrick Twumasi, Astana

4 goals:

 Đorđe Despotović, Kairat

3 goals:

 Azamat Aubakirov, Ekibastuz
 Gerard Gohou, Kairat

2 goals:

 Didar Zhalmukan, Aktobe
 Vladimir Vyatkin, Caspiy
 Amangeldy Duisembaev, Ekibastuz
 Bauyrzhan Islamkhan, Kairat
 Luka Rotkovic, Okzhetpes

1 goal:

 Marcos Pizzelli, Aktobe
 Danilo Neco, Aktobe
 Viktor Dmitrenko, Aktobe
 Valeri Korobkin, Aktobe
 Sergei Khizhnichenko, Aktobe
 Artūras Žulpa, Aktobe
 Oleksiy Antonov, Aktobe
 Ivan Antipov, Akzhayik
 Igor Khromtsov, Akzhayik
 Anton Shurygin, Akzhayik
 Bauyrzhan Dzholchiev, Astana
 Birjan Kulbekov, Astana
 Aleksey Shchetkin, Astana
 Roman Pavinic, Bolat-AMT
 Dmitri Zverev, Bolat-AMT
 Vyasheslav Serdyukov, Caspiy
 Aslan Orazaev, CSKA Almaty
 Samit Shulagov, CSKA Almaty
 Marat Iskulov, Ekibastuz
 Viktor Pavlenok, Ekibastuz
 Igor Voynov, Ekibastuz
 Isael, Kairat
 Zhambyl Kukeyev, Kairat
 Mark Gorman, Kairat
 Sito Riera, Kairat
 Edin Junuzović, Kaisar
 Maxim Filshakov, Kyran
 Elmar Nabiyev, Kyzylzhar
 Egor Azovskiy , Okzhetpes
 Ruslan Sakhalbayev, Okzhetpes
 Taras Danilyuk, Spartak Semey
 Marat Togyzbay, Taraz
 Almir Mukhutdinov, Taraz
 Tomáš Šimkovič, Tobol
 Artem Deli, Tobol
 Temirlan Elmurzayev, Tobol
 Nurbol Zhumaskaliyev, Tobol
 Igor Bugaev, Tobol
 Vyasheslav Erbes, Vostok
 Vitali Kuyanov, Vostok
 Bauyrzhan Turysbek, Zhetysu

Own goal

 Sergey Kutsov (28 April 2015 vs Kaisar)
 Michal Smejkal (29 April 2015 vs Shakhter Karagandy)

References

External links 
 

2015
Cup
2015 domestic association football cups